Ralf Bödeker (born 12 May 1958) is a former German football player.

Career 
Between 1978 and 1982, Bödeker played for Borussia Mönchengladbach as a midfielder. He made 32 appearances and scored one goal in the Bundesliga.

Honours 
 UEFA Cup: 1978–79
 Kirin Cup: 1978 (Shared with SE Palmeiras)

References

External links
 

1958 births
Living people
Borussia Mönchengladbach players
Borussia Mönchengladbach II players
Bundesliga players
German footballers
Association football midfielders
West German footballers